Qin Dongya (born July 8, 1978 in Liaoyang, Liaoning) is a female Chinese judoka who competed in the 2004 Summer Olympics.

She won the bronze medal in the middleweight class.

References

External links
 
 
 

1978 births
Living people
Judoka at the 2000 Summer Olympics
Judoka at the 2004 Summer Olympics
Olympic bronze medalists for China
Olympic judoka of China
Olympic medalists in judo
Asian Games medalists in judo
Judoka at the 2002 Asian Games
Judoka at the 2006 Asian Games
Sportspeople from Liaoyang
Medalists at the 2004 Summer Olympics
Chinese female judoka

Asian Games gold medalists for China
Asian Games bronze medalists for China
Medalists at the 2002 Asian Games
Universiade medalists in judo
Medalists at the 2006 Asian Games
Universiade gold medalists for China
20th-century Chinese women
21st-century Chinese women